Slovakia participated at the 2017 Summer Universiade, in Taipei, Taiwan.

Medal summary

Medal by sports

References

 Slovakia Overview

External links
Universiade Taipei 2017

Nations at the 2017 Summer Universiade